Sports Museum can refer to:
The Sports Museum, a museum located in Boston, Massachusetts
Sports Museum (Singapore), a former museum in Singapore